Kongen befaler is a Norwegian comedy programme based on the British show Taskmaster. It has been broadcast on TVNorge and discovery+ since 2019. The show features five fixed panelists per series who all complete tasks, judged by Atle Antonsen from Series 1-6, then by Bård Ylvisåker for Series 7 onwards, and assisted by Olli Wermskog.

The format for the show was created by British comedian Alex Horne during the Edinburgh Festival Fringe in 2010, and was subsequently developed into a successful UK television show in 2015. Kongen befaler translates as "the king commands" and is the Norwegian name of the game Simon Says.

The studio sections are recorded in Drammens Teater, a theatre in Drammen, 40 km from Oslo.

Episodes

Series 1 (2019) 
The first series was aired in 2019 on TVNorge, between 17 October and 19 December. Vegard Ylvisåker, Maria Stavang, Calle Hellevang-Larsen, Bård Ylvisåker and Siri Kristiansen were participants. The winner of the season was Vegard Ylvisåker.

Series 2 (2020) 
The second series was aired in 2020 between 24 September and 16 November. The contestants were Maria Stavang, Calle Hellevang-Larsen, Jon Almaas, Mia Hundvin and Magnus Devold. The winner of the season was Calle Hellevang-Larsen.

Series 3 (2021) 
The third series was aired in 2021 between 4 February and 25 March. The contestants were Egil Hegerberg, Trond Fausa Aurvåg, Linn Skåber, Jenny Skavlan and Erik Follestad. Jenny Skavlan was this season's winner.

Series 4 (2021) 
The fourth series was aired in 2021 between 23 September and 9 December. The contestants were  Amir Asgharnejad, Ida Fladen, Einar Tørnquist, Steinar Sagen and Solveig Kloppen. The winner of the season was Einar Tørnquist.

Series 5 (2022) 
The fifth series was aired in 2022 between 24 February and 28 April. The contestants were Harald Eia, Janne Formoe, Henrik Elvestad, Kristine Grændsen and Martin Lepperød. The season was won by Harald Eia.

Series 6 (2022) 
The sixth series was aired in 2022 between 15 September and 20 November. The contestants were Live Nelvik, Espen Eckbo, Martha Leivestad, Kristoffer Olsen, and Henriette Steenstrup. The series was won by Kristoffer Olsen.

Series 7 (2023) 
The seventh series started airing 26 January 2023 and is the first series to be presented by Bård Ylvisåker, who also participated in Series 1. The contestants are Leo Ajkic, Karin Klouman, Lars Berrum, Hani Hussein and Vidar Magnussen.

References 

Taskmaster (TV series)
2019 Norwegian television series debuts
2010s game shows
2010s Norwegian television series
2020s game shows
2020s Norwegian television series
Norwegian television series based on British television series
TVNorge original programming
Norwegian-language television shows